Fahrudin Šolbić (born 23 October 1958) is a Bosnian professional football manager.

He was most recently manager of Bosnian Premier League club Mladost Doboj Kakanj, firstly as caretaker manager and then as permanent manager. Šolbić was also manager of Rudar Kakanj.

Managerial statistics

References

External links
Fahrudin Šolbić at Sofascore

1958 births
Living people
People from Kakanj
Bosnia and Herzegovina football managers
Premier League of Bosnia and Herzegovina managers
FK Rudar Kakanj managers 
FK Mladost Doboj Kakanj managers